Voices of Music (VOM) is a non-profit American musical ensemble based in San Francisco, California, that specializes in the performance of early music, especially Renaissance music, and Baroque compositions, using historically informed musical performance practices and instrumentation.

History
Voices of Music was founded in 2007 by artistic codirectors, and musician-scholars, Hanneke van Proosdij and David Tayler. The ensemble performs music by Johann Sebastian Bach, Arcangelo Corelli, Claudio Monteverdi, Georg Philipp Telemann and Antonio Vivaldi, among others. Through its website and social media, the group provides free and easy access to information and related materials about their concerts and recordings (including those on CD Baby) to all members of the public.

Mission
According to their mission statement, the goal of Voices of Music is to offer the following: "concerts and recordings of music composed before 1800, affordable educational programs for children and adults, advanced training for the next generation of young professionals and community outreach [as well as to provide] music of the highest quality in live performances [and to] introduce new audiences of all ages to the world of early classical music".

Recognition
Voices of Music is distinguished as the first early music group to broadcast their concerts in high-definition video over the internet, providing the worldwide public with numerous free to share concerts. The group has won several awards, including "Best of the Bay" awards, and a "Laurette Goldberg Award" for outstanding outreach and educational projects. Reviews of musical performances by the ensemble have been presented by many. According to the San Francisco Classical Voice, Voices of Music are "splendidly colorful and imaginative", and, as presented in Early Music Today (UK), "early music marvels". The music performances of Voices of Music are considered "of historic, national significance". Voices of Music has been regarded as “the most popular early music ensemble in the United States, and one of the most popular music ensembles of any kind in the world today”.

See also
Authenticity in art
Early music revival
 List of early music ensembles#United States

References

Further reading
 Kosman, Joshua. (December 14, 2016). Baroque virtuosity takes center stage. San Francisco Chronicle.
 Latulipp, David (May 31, 2016). "Voices of Music". KALW.
 Latulipp, David (March 16, 2017). "Voices of Music 10th anniversary". KALW.
 MacBean, James Roy (June 10, 2016). "Violinist Rachel Podger Performs with Voices of Music". Berkeley Daily Planet.

External links
 Voices of Music – Official Website
 Voices of Music – Featured YouTube Channel
 Voices of Music (video; 42:03) – The Four Seasons by Vivaldi
 Voices of Music (video; 11:42) – Brandenburg Concerto No 3 by Bach
 

American classical music groups
American performers of early music
Bach music ensembles
Bach orchestras
Chamber orchestras
Choirs in the San Francisco Bay Area
Early music choirs
Early music orchestras
Early music record labels
Musical groups established in 2007
Musical groups from San Francisco
Non-profit organizations based in San Francisco
Orchestras based in California
2007 establishments in California